Robert Owen Majors (born July 7, 1949) is a former American football defensive back who played one season with the Cleveland Browns of the National Football League (NFL). He was drafted by the Philadelphia Eagles in the third round of the 1972 NFL Draft. Majors played college football at the University of Tennessee, Knoxville. He was a consensus All-American in 1971. He was also a member of the Memphis Southmen of the World Football League (WFL).  He is the younger brother of former Tennessee head coach Johnny Majors.

College career
In 1970, Majors set the single-season Tennessee Volunteers record for interceptions with ten and the Volunteers led the NCAA with 36 interceptions. He returned punts and kicks as a member of the Volunteers. He holds the school records for career punt returns with 117 and career punt return yardage with 1,163. Majors had 13 career interceptions at Tennessee. He was named to the University of Tennessee 100-year team as the "Defensive Back of All Time". He was a consensus All-American in 1971. He was named All-SEC in 1970 and 1971. Majors was named to the 2011 SEC Football Legends Class.

Professional career
Majors was drafted by the Philadelphia Eagles of the NFL with the seventy-sixth pick in the 1972 NFL Draft. He signed with the Eagles in May 1972. He was signed by the NFL's Cleveland Browns in October 1972. He spent the 1974 season with the Memphis Southmen of the WFL.

Personal life
Bobby's four brothers Johnny, Bill, Larry and Joe also played football. Their father, Shirley Majors, was a college football coach at Sewanee.

References

External links
 Just Sports Stats
  College stats

1949 births
Living people
American football defensive backs
American football return specialists
Cleveland Browns players
Memphis Southmen players
Tennessee Volunteers football players
All-American college football players
People from Lynchburg, Tennessee
Players of American football from Tennessee